The surname Piscator may refer to:
 Erwin Piscator (1893–1966), German theatre director
 Maria Ley-Piscator (1898–1999), Austrian dancer and choreographer
 Johannes Piscator (1546–1625), German theologian and instructor
Nicolas Joannes Piscator (1587 – 1652), Latinized name of Claes Janszoon Visscher , Dutch Golden Age draughtsman, engraver, mapmaker and publisher.

Latin-language surnames
Occupational surnames